Nagau is a mountain range located in the Kalat District of Balochistan, Pakistan. It is located at 29°16'30N 67°17'55E.

References

Mountain ranges of Balochistan (Pakistan)